Robert James Sabuda (born March 8, 1965) is a children's pop-up book artist and paper engineer. His innovative designs have made him well-known in the book arts, with The New York Times referring to Sabuda as "indisputably the king of pop-ups" in a 2003 article.

Early life 
Robert Sabuda was born on March 8, 1965, in Wyandotte, Michigan. He was raised in Pinckney, Michigan. His father was a mason and a carpenter, providing Sabuda with an appreciation for precise construction. His mother worked as a secretary for the Ford Motor Company and brought home manila folders that Robert would use to create art projects such as pop-up cards and books.

He attended Pratt Institute in New York City, earning a Bachelor of Fine Arts in communications design in 1987.

Career 
Sabuda's interest in paper engineering was sparked in childhood by reading a version of Cinderella illustrated by Vojtěch Kubašta. He created his first pop-up book at age eight. 

His career in book illustration began with an internship at Dial Books for Young Readers while attending Pratt. Initially working as a package designer, he illustrated his first children's book series, Bulky Board Books, in 1987. He began gaining professional recognition in 1994 when he designed his first pop-up books for children, The Christmas Alphabet.

Within the books he has designed, Sabuda has used techniques including:
 faux stained glass (Arthur and the Sword, 1995)
 batik (Blizzard's Robe, 1999)
 papyrus-textured illustrations (Tutankhamen's Gift, 1994)
 murals (Saint Valentine, 1992)

Recognition 
Sabuda works from his studio in New York City and is involved in a wide variety of projects that involve movable paper, collaborating frequently with Matthew Reinhart. Sabuda has been awarded the Meggendorfer Prize for Best Paper Engineering three times by the Movable Book Society. He has created multiple New York Times best-selling children's books and has over five million books in print published in over 25 languages.

Book critic Ted Chapin described Sabuda as a "prolific master of the pop-up book" and "something of an artistic and engineering genius" in The New York Times. A 2011 article in The Wall Street Journal said Sabuda is "a master at making books come to life" and referred to him as "the reigning prince of pop-up books." Sabuda's versions of The Wonderful Wizard of Oz (2000) and Alice's Adventures in Wonderland (2003) have been particularly praised, with graphic designer Steven Heller saying of Alice that "the intelligent paper trickery on each spread is, well, awesome."

Personal life 
Sabuda is married to technologist James Talvy. They spend their time in New York City; New Paltz, New York; and Fort Lauderdale, Florida.

References

External links 
  (bibliography is only as an illustrator for speculative fiction works)
 "Robert Sabuda" 19-minute video from the PBS series Reading Rockets discussing the author's inspirations and techniques (2011)

1965 births
Living people
American people of Polish descent
American children's book illustrators
Pop-up book artists
People from Wyandotte, Michigan
People from Pinckney, Michigan
Pratt Institute alumni